The second HMS Waldegrave (K579), and the first to enter service, was a British Captain-class frigate of the Royal Navy in commission during World War II. Originally constructed as a United States Navy Buckley class destroyer escort, she served in the Royal Navy from 1944 to 1945.

Construction and transfer
The ship was laid down as the unnamed U.S. Navy destroyer escort DE-570 by Bethlehem-Hingham Shipyard, Inc., in Hingham, Massachusetts, on 16 October 1943 and launched on 4 December 1943. She was transferred to the United Kingdom upon completion on 25 January 1944.

Service history

The ship was commissioned into service in the Royal Navy  as the frigate HMS Waldegrave (K579) on 25 January 1944 simultaneously with her transfer. She served in the Royal Navy for the duration of World War II, garnering battle honours for her operations in the North Atlantic Ocean and English Channel and the Normandy Landings at the American Beachheads.

The Royal Navy returned Waldegrave to the U.S. Navy on 3 December 1945.

Disposal
The U.S. Navy struck Waldegrave from its Naval Vessel Register on 21 January 1946. She soon was sold to the Atlas Steel and Supply Company of Cleveland, Ohio, for scrapping, then resold later in 1946 to the Kulka Steel and Equipment Company of Alliance, Ohio, and sold a third and final time on 8 December 1946 to the Bristol Engineering Company of Somerset, Massachusetts. She was scrapped in June 1948.

References

Navsource Online: Destroyer Escort Photo Archive Waldegrave (DE-570) HMS Waldegrave (K-579)
uboat.net HMS Waldegrave (K 579)
Destroyer Escort Sailors Association DEs for UK
Captain Class Frigate Association HMS Waldegrave K579 (DE 570)

External links
Photo gallery of HMS Waldegrave (K579)

 

Captain-class frigates
Buckley-class destroyer escorts
World War II frigates of the United Kingdom
Ships built in Hingham, Massachusetts
1943 ships